Black Seed ( translit. Crno seme) is a 1971 Macedonian drama film directed by Kiril Cenevski. The film was selected as the Yugoslav entry for the Best Foreign Language Film at the 44th Academy Awards, but was not accepted as a nominee. It was also entered into the 7th Moscow International Film Festival.

The film recounts the story of Macedonian soldiers in the Greek army being transported to prison camps on Greek islands. Suspected of being communists, they are maltreated by the Greek officers running the camp.

Cast
 Darko Damevski as Andon Sovicanov
 Aco Jovanovski as Hristos Soglomov
 Risto Siskov as Paris
 Pavle Vuisić as Maki
 Voja Mirić as Major
 Mite Grozdanov as Marko
 Nenad Milosavljević as Niko

See also
 List of submissions to the 44th Academy Awards for Best Foreign Language Film
 List of Yugoslav submissions for the Academy Award for Best Foreign Language Film

References

External links
 

1971 films
1971 drama films
Macedonian drama films
Serbian-language films
Films directed by Kiril Cenevski
Yugoslav drama films
Films set in Greece
1971 directorial debut films
Prisoner of war films